Ro-63, originally named Submarine No. 84, was an Imperial Japanese Navy Type L submarine of the L4 subclass. First commissioned in 1924, she served in the waters of Japan prior to World War II. During World War II, she operated in the Central Pacific and took part in the Aleutian Islands campaign, then in late 1942 was relegated to a role as a training ship and tender for midget submarines. After the war ended in 1945, she surrendered to the Allies, who scuttled her in 1946.

Design and description
The submarines of the Type L4 sub-class were copies of the Group 3 subclass of the British L-class submarine built under license in Japan. They were slightly larger and had two more torpedo tubes than the preceding submarines of the L3 subclass. They displaced  surfaced and  submerged.

For surface running, the submarines were powered by two  Vickers diesel engines, each driving one propeller shaft. When submerged, each propeller was driven by an  electric motor. They could reach  on the surface and  underwater.

The submarines were armed with six internal  torpedo tubes, all in the bow, and carried a total of twelve 6th Year Type torpedoes. They were also armed with a single  deck gun and a 6.5 mm machine gun.

Construction and commissioning

Ro-63 was laid down as Submarine No. 84 on 2 April 1923 by Mitsubishi at Kobe, Japan. Launched on 24 January 1924, she was renamed Ro-63 on 1 November 1924 while fitting out. She was completed and commissioned on 20 December 1924.

Service history

Pre-World War II

Upon commissioning, Ro-63 was attached to the Maizuru Naval District and assigned to Submarine Division 33. On 1 June 1925, she was transferred to the Sasebo Naval District and reassigned to Submarine Division 24, in which she remained until 1939. Submarine Division 24 was reassigned to Submarine Squadron 1 in the 1st Fleet in the Combined Fleet on 1 December 1925. The nine submarines got underway from Okinawa on 30 March 1926 for a training cruise in Chinese waters off Shanghai and Amoy which concluded with their arrival at Mako in the Pescadores Islands on 5 April 1926. They departed Mako on 20 April 1926 for the return leg of their training cruise, operating off China near Chusan Island, then returned to Sasebo on 26 April 1926. On 27 March 1927, Ro-60, Ro-61, Ro-62, Ro-63, Ro-64, and Ro-68 departed Saeki Bay, Japan, for a training cruise off Tsingtao, China, which they concluded with their arrival at Sasebo, Japan, on 16 May 1927.

On 10 December 1928, Submarine Division 24 was transferred back to the Sasebo Naval District and began service in the Sasebo Defense Division. Ro-63 was decommissioned  on 10 March 1929 and placed in reserve at Maizuru, but was recommissioned on 29 June 1929. While proceeding to Sasebo, Japan, on 13 November 1929 after conducting diving exercises with Ro-64, Ro-63 collided off Sasebo with the small Japanese motor vessel , suffering minor damage to her starboard bow.

Submarine Division 24 returned to duty in Submarine Squadron 1 in the 1st Fleet on 30 November 1929. It transferred back to the Sasebo Naval District on 1 December 1930 and began a stint in the Sasebo Defense Division on 1 December 1931. Ro-63 again was decommissioned on 1 December 1932 and placed in reserve at Maizuru.

Ro-63 was recommissioned on 20 March 1934, resuming active service in Submarine Division 24, which by then was assigned to the Sasebo Guard Squadron in the Sasebo Naval District. The division′s service in the Sasebo Guard Squadron ended on 15 November 1934, after which it was assigned directly to the Sasebo Naval District until 1 December 1936, when it was assigned to the Sasebo Defense Squadron. It resumed its direct assignment to the Sasebo Naval District on 1 January 1938.

Ro-63 was transferred to Submarine Division 33 on either 1 September or 15 November 1938, according to different sources, for service at the submarine school at Kure, Japan. On 15 November 1939, Submarine Division 33 was reassigned to Submarine Squadron 7 in the 4th Fleet in the Combined Fleet. When the Imperial Japanese Navy deployed for the upcoming conflict in the Pacific, Ro-63 was at Kwajalein in the Marshall Islands. She received the message "Climb Mount Niitaka 1208" from the Combined Fleet on 2 December 1941, indicating that war with the Allies would commence on 8 December 1941 Japan time, which was on 7 December 1941 on the other side of the International Date Line in Hawaii, where Japanese plans called for the war to open with their attack on Pearl Harbor.

World War II

Central Pacific
Ro-63 was with the other submarines of Submarine Division 33 — Ro-64 and  — at Kwajalein when Japan entered World War II on 8 December 1941, Kwajalein time. That day, she got underway to conduct a reconnaissance of Howland Island.

Ro-63 departed Kwajalein on 7 January 1942 and called at Truk in the Caroline Islands from 11 to 15 January before getting back underway in company with Ro-64 and Ro-68 to conduct a reconnaissance of Rabaul on New Britain in the Admiralty Islands. She then patrolled south of Cape St. George on New Ireland before returning to Truk on 29 January 1942.

Ro-63, Ro-64, and Ro-68 left Truk on 18 February 1942, called at Ponape from 23 to 24 February, and then set out for the Marshall Islands area. During their voyage, however, Ro-63′s horizontal rudder failed on 27 February 1942, and she proceeded to Bikini Atoll for repairs in company with Ro-64. The two submarines reached Bikini on 28 February 1942. They got back underway on 1 March 1942, but Ro-63′s jury-rigged rudder quickly broke again and she turned back to Bikini while Ro-64 proceeded independently. On 2 March 1942, she departed Bikini to head for Japan for repairs, calling along the way at Ponape from 5 to 7 March 1942, at Truk from 9 to 19 March 1942, and at Saipan in the Mariana Islands from 22 to 26 March 1942 before arriving at Maizuru on 3 April 1942.

After her repairs were completed, Ro-63 departed Maizuru on 5 June 1942, arrived at Saipan on 13 June, and then made for Truk. Recalled to Japan, she departed Truk on 27 June 1942 bound for Yokosuka, Japan, which she reached on 4 July 1942.

Aleutian Islands campaign
On 14 July 1942, Submarine Division 33 was reassigned to the 5th Fleet for service in the Aleutian Islands, where the Aleutian Islands campaign had begun in June 1942 with the Japanese occupation of Attu and Kiska. At 16:00 on 24 July 1942, Ro-63, Ro-64, and Ro-68 departed Yokosuka bound for Paramushiro in the northern Kurile Islands. Ro-64 was forced to return to Yokosuka when food poisoning broke out among her crew, but Ro-63 and Ro-68 pressed on and  arrived at Paramushiro on 29 July 1942. Ro-63 and Ro-68 put to sea again on 31 July 1942 to head for Kiska, which they reached on 4 August 1942.

On 7 August 1942, an American task force bombarded Kiska while I-6, Ro-61, Ro-64, and Ro-68 were anchored in the harbor, and they crash-dived to avoid damage. Between 8 and 10 August 1942, Ro-61, Ro-63, Ro-64, and Ro-68 sought to intercept the American ships, but failed to find them. From 11 to 13 August 1942, Ro-63 participated with Ro-64 and Ro-68 in a search for the crew of a ditched reconnaissance plane, and Ro-63 subsequently conducted patrols off the Aleutians from her base at Kiska from 17 to 20 August, 28 to 30 August, 3 to 5 September, and 6 to 11 September 1942.

On 14 September 1942, Ro-63 was anchored at Kiska when American aircraft raided the base. She submerged to avoid attack, but a bomb a United States Army Air Forces Eleventh Air Force B-24 Liberator dropped nonetheless damaged one of her periscopes while she was underwater. Submarine Division 33 was attached directly to the 51st Base Unit at Kiska on 15 September 1942, and Ro-63 carried out another Aleutians patrol from 22 to 24 September 1942.

While Ro-63 was at Kiska on 25 September 1942, Submarine Division 33 was reassigned to the Kure Naval District. Ro-63, Ro-64, and Ro-68 departed Kiska on 26 September 1942 bound for Maizuru, where they arrived on 5 October 1942.

Training and tender duties

Ro-63 departed Maizuru on 6 November 1942 and arrived at Kure on 8 November 1942. Thereafter, Submarine Division 33 was assigned to training duties in the Kure Naval District. It was assigned to the Kure Submarine Squadron on 1 December 1943.

On 28 March 1945, Ro-63 was selected for conversion to a tender for Type D (Kōryū) midget submarines based on Amami Ōshima in the Amami Islands. After completion of a makeshift conversion at the Kure Naval Arsenal that included the installation of a Type 96 25 mm anti-aircraft gun and a radar detector, Ro-63 departed Kure on 8 April 1945, stopped at Sasebo, and then got underway from Sasebo on 10 April 1945 bound for Amami Ōshima. She arrived at Koniya on Amami Ōshima on 13 April 1945 and unloaded her cargo of torpedoes and spare parts. Continual Allied air attacks forced her to remain submerged on the harbor bottom at Koniya by day and surface only at night to perform her tender duties during darkness. On 29 April 1945, she received orders to return to Sasebo. After loading a cargo of sugar at Kasari Bay on Amami Ōshima on 30 April, Ro-63 headed for Sasebo, which she reached on 3 May 1945.

After her arrival at Sasebo, Ro-63 was drydocked until mid-May 1945, when she proceeded to Ōtake, Japan, to resume her training activities at the submarine school there. She was at Maizuru when hostilities between Japan and the Allies ended on 15 August 1945. She subsequently surrendered to Allied forces.

Disposal
The Japanese struck Ro-63 from the Navy list on 20 November 1945. Allied forces scuttled her in the Iyo Nada in the Seto Inland Sea in May 1946.

References

Bibliography
, History of Pacific War Extra, "Perfect guide, The submarines of the Imperial Japanese Forces", Gakken (Japan), March 2005, 
The Maru Special, Japanese Naval Vessels No.43 Japanese Submarines III, Ushio Shobō (Japan), September 1980, Book code 68343-44
The Maru Special, Japanese Naval Vessels No.132 Japanese Submarines I "Revised edition", Ushio Shobō (Japan), February 1988, Book code 68344-36
The Maru Special, Japanese Naval Vessels No.133 Japanese Submarines II "Revised edition", Ushio Shobō (Japan), March 1988, Book code 68344-37

Ro-60-class submarines
Japanese L type submarines
Ships built by Mitsubishi Heavy Industries
1924 ships
World War II submarines of Japan
Ships of the Aleutian Islands campaign
Maritime incidents in 1929
Maritime incidents in 1946
Scuttled vessels
Shipwrecks in the Pacific Ocean
Shipwrecks of Japan